The Serenade No. 11 for winds in E-flat major, K. 375, was written by Wolfgang Amadeus Mozart on 15 October 1781 for St Theresa's day.

The original version of the serenade is scored for six players: 2 clarinets, 2 horns, and 2 bassoons. Mozart later revised the score to add parts for two oboes.

It has five movements:
Allegro maestoso
Menuetto
Adagio
Menuetto
Allegro

References

External links

Serenade 11
Compositions in E-flat major
1781 compositions